Akeley Motion Picture Camera is a black and white photograph taken by Paul Strand in 1922. It depicts the innovative motion picture camera that the American photographer bought for $2500 and that allowed him to work in the film industry as a cinematographer until 1931, when the camera became obsolete. Strand took several pictures of the camera and this became one of the most famous.

History and description
Strand had worked with Charles Sheeler in the avant-garde film Manhatta, in 1920. This inspired him to buy his own motion picture camera, with which he would earn much of his living in the 1920s. He took several photographs of the camera, shortly after buying it. This picture depicts the interior film chamber, without the film, shot from upside down, at a 45-degrees angle, and expresses his interest in his functional and rigorous forms and the shine of his highly polished metal surface.

Art market
A print of this picture reached the highest price for a Paul Strand photograph when it was sold by $783,750 at Christie's New York on 4 April 2013.

Public collections
There are prints  in several public collections, including the Metropolitan Museum of Art, in New York, and The Art Institute of Chicago.

References

1922 in art
1920s photographs
Black-and-white photographs
Photographs by Paul Strand
Photographs of the Metropolitan Museum of Art
Photographs of the Art Institute of Chicago